The Great Offshore Grounds is an American novel, by Vanessa Veselka. It won the Oregon Book Award and was longlisted for the U.S. National Book Award.

On the novel

The novel is post-capitalist fiction.

References

External links

 Vanessa Veselka's writing page
 The Boston Globe on The Great Offshore Grounds
 Goodreads on The Great Offshore Grounds
 Mybookcart, comments on post-capitalism
 Nationalbook.org of The Great Offshore Grounds

21st-century American novels
Year of work missing
Alfred A. Knopf books